Robin Philip Gifford (born 9 May 1974) is a Zimbabwean former cricketer. He was a right-handed batsman and a right-arm off-break bowler who played for Mashonaland Under-24s. He was born in Sinoia (now Chinhoyi).

Gifford made an appearance for Matabeleland Schools against Ireland during an Irish tour of Zimbabwe in 1991. He also made an appearance for Zimbabwe Under-19s against Durham, three months after the English county were granted first-class status.

Gifford made two further cricketing appearances, for Zimbabwe Schools, in a Youth Cricket Challenge competition in January 1993.

Gifford played twice in the UCB Bowl for a Zimbabwe Board XI and one appearance in the Logan Cup for Mashonaland Under-24s - making a top score of 44 before being run out.

External links
Robin Gifford at CricketArchive 

1974 births
Living people
Sportspeople from Chinhoyi
Zimbabwean cricketers